Yuba County (Maidu: Yubu) is a county in the U.S. state of California. As of the 2020 U.S. Census, its population was 81,575. The county seat is Marysville. Yuba County is included in the Yuba Citymetropolitan statistical area, which is also included in the Sacramento–Roseville combined statistical area. The county is in the Central Valley region along the Feather River.

Despite its name and proximity, Yuba City is in neighboring Sutter County, not Yuba County.

History
Yuba County was one of California's original counties, formed in 1850 at the time of statehood. Parts of the county's territory were given to Placer County in 1851, to Nevada County in 1851, and to Sierra County in 1852.

The county was named after the Yuba River by Captain John Sutter for the Maidu village Yubu, Yupu, or Juba near the confluence of the Yuba and Feather Rivers. General Mariano Vallejo said the river was named Uba by an exploring expedition in 1824 because of the quantities of wild grapes (uvas silvestres in Spanish) that they found growing on its banks.

Geography
It is California's fifth-smallest county by area. The county lies along the western slope of the Sierra Nevada, the steep slopes making it prime territory for the siting of hydroelectric power plants.

Part of the county, where Marysville (the county seat) and most of the population lives, is west of the mountains on the valley floor. A great deal of agriculture business occurs in this part of the county, especially fruit orchards, rice fields, and cattle grazing.

Ecology
Studies by the Biota of North America Program suggest Yuba is the most biodiverse county in the contiguous United States, with 1,968 native vascular plant species per , a figure that exceeds the most species-rich parts of Florida. The county exhibits a considerable diversity of flowering plant species, among them the yellow mariposa lily, Calochortus luteus.

National protected areas in Yuba County include parts of the Plumas National Forest and the Tahoe National Forest. The county also has extensive natural areas consisting of forestation, grassland, riparian area, grasslands, and other habitats.

Adjacent counties
 Butte County to the north
 Sierra County to the northeast
 Nevada County to the east
 Placer County to the southeast
 Sutter County to the southwest

Crime 

This table includes the number of incidents reported and the rate per 1,000 persons for each type of offense:

Cities by population and crime rates

Politics

Voter registration statistics

Cities by population and voter registration

Overview 
Yuba is a strongly Republican county in presidential and congressional elections. The last Democratic presidential nominee to win a majority in the county was Jimmy Carter in 1976.

Transportation

Major highways
 State Route 20
 State Route 49
 State Route 65
 State Route 70

Public transportation
Yuba Sutter Transit operates local bus service, as well as commuter runs to downtown Sacramento. Greyhound buses stop in Marysville.

Airports
Yuba County Airport is 3 miles (5 km) south of Marysville. It is a general-aviation airport.

Brownsville Aero Pines Airport is off La Porte Rd in Brownsville.

Demographics

2020 census

Note: the US Census treats Hispanic/Latino as an ethnic category. This table excludes Latinos from the racial categories and assigns them to a separate category. Hispanics/Latinos can be of any race.

2011

Places by population, race, and income

2010
The 2010 United States Census reported that Yuba County had a population of 72,155. The racial makeup of Yuba County was 49,332 (68.4%) White, 2,361 (3.3%) African American]], 1,675 (2.3%) Native American, 4,862 (6.7%) Asian, 293 (0.4%) Pacific Islander, 8,545 (11.8%) from other races, and 5,087 (7.1%) from two or more races. Hispanics or Latinos of any race were 18,051 persons (25.0%).

2000
As of the census of 2000,  60,219 people, 20,535 households, and 14,805 families resided in the county. The 22,636 housing units had an average density of 36 per square mile (14/km2). The racial makeup of the county was 70.6% White, 3.2% African American, 2.6% Native American, 7.5% Asian, 0.2% Pacific Islander, 10.0% from other races, and 5.9% from two or more races. About 17.4% of the population were Hispanics or Latinos of any race. Ancestry distribution was 11.2% German, 10.4% American, 7.6% Irish, and 7.5% English according to Census 2000; 78.8% spoke English, 13.2% Spanish, and 4.7% Hmong as their first language.

Of the 20,535 households, 38.1% had children under living with them, 53.2% were married couples living together, 13.3% had a female householder with no husband present, and 27.9% were not families. About 21.7% of all households were made up of individuals, and 8.2% had someone living alone who was 65 or older. The average household size was 2.87, and the average family size was 3.34.

In the county, the age distribution was 31.0% under 18, 10.7% from 18 to 24, 28.0% from 25 to 44, 19.6% from 45 to 64, and 10.6% who were 65 or older. The median age was 31 years. For every 100 females, there were 101.6 males. For every 100 females 18 and over, there were 99.4 males.

The median income for a household in the county was $30,460, and for a family was $34,103. Males had a median income of $27,845 versus $21,301 for females. The per capita income for the county was $14,124. About 16.3% of families and 20.8% of the population were below the poverty line, including 27.6% of those under age 18 and 7.8% of those age 65 or over.

Education
Higher education is available at Yuba Community College. The county also has a Yuba County Library system with one branch in Marysville.

Yuba County schools have a 16% suspension rate, with 2,257 students receiving suspensions out of 14,027 students enrolled in Yuba County schools.

Communities

Cities
Marysville (county seat)
Wheatland

Census-designated places

Beale Air Force Base
Camptonville
Challenge-Brownsville
Dobbins
Linda
Loma Rica
Olivehurst
Plumas Lake
Smartsville

Other unincorporated communities

Arboga
Binney Junction
Browns Valley
Eagleville
East Arboga
Frenchtown
Greenville
Hammonton
Horstville
Oak Valley
Oregon House
Rackerby
Sicard Flat
Strawberry Valley
Timbuctoo
Waldo Junction
Woodleaf

Ghost towns

Condemned Bar
Plumas Landing
Round Tent

Population ranking

The population ranking of the following table is based on the 2010 census of Yuba County.

† county seat

See also 

 Hiking trails in Yuba County
 National Register of Historic Places listings in Yuba County, California
 Yuba County Five

Notes

References
Specific

General

External links

South Yuba County Live Weather and Scanner Feed

 
California counties
Counties in the Sacramento metropolitan area
Sacramento Valley
1850 establishments in California
Populated places established in 1850